Tales From Firozsha Baag is a collection of 11 short stories by Rohinton Mistry about the residents of Firozsha Baag, a Parsi-dominated apartment complex in Mumbai. Mistry's first book, it was published by Penguin Canada in 1987.

Stories
 "Auspicious Occasion"
 "One Sunday"
 "The Ghost of Firozsha Baag"
 "Condolence Visit"
 "The Collectors"
 "Of White Hairs and Cricket"
 "The Paying Guests"
 "Squatter"
 "Lend Me Your Light"
 "Exercisers"
 "Swimming Lessons"

Awards
1983 First Prize, Hart House Literary Contest for "One Sunday" (short story)
1984 First Prize, Hart House Literary Contest for "Auspicious Occasion" (short story)
1985 Annual Contributors' Prize, Canadian Fiction Magazine

References

Mumbai in fiction
Canadian short story collections
Books by Rohinton Mistry
1987 short story collections
New Canadian Library